The Joint Intelligence Operations Center Europe (JIOCEUR) Analytic Center (JAC), formerly known as the Joint Analysis Center, is a Joint Intelligence Center serving as a focal point of military intelligence for the United States European Command located at RAF Molesworth, Cambridgeshire, UK. The JIOCEUR is administered by the Defense Intelligence Agency. The area of responsibility includes over 50 countries in Europe and the Middle East.

External links
 Joint Analysis Center a profile on JAC by Federation of American Scientists

United States intelligence agencies
Defense Intelligence Agency